Raman Ashok Kumar (28 May 1961 – 25 September 2022), better known as Ashokan, was an Indian filmmaker from Kerala. He was also the Managing director of Oberon, an IT firm operating in Gulf and Kochi. 

Joining as an assistant director in Aattakalasam, he mastered the skills in directing feature films during his seven-year tutelage with Malayalam film director J. Sasikumar, Ashokan is known for his debut directorial Varnam (1989), a commercial success and Mookilla Rajyathu, the terrific classic comedy that you won't get bored even if you watch it countless times, as reviewed by The Times of India.

Ashokan has also directed Kanappurangal, that won the second best tele film at Kerala State television awards 2001.

Ashokan died in Kochi on 25 September 2022, at the age of 60.

Filmography
 Films

References

External links
 

1961 births
2022 deaths
20th-century Indian film directors
Film directors from Kerala
Malayalam film directors